Climate change in Oklahoma encompasses the effects of climate change, attributed to man-made increases in atmospheric carbon dioxide, in the U.S. state of Oklahoma.

The United States Environmental Protection Agency has noted: "In the coming decades, Oklahoma will become warmer, and both floods and droughts may be more severe. Most of Oklahoma did not become warmer during the last 50 to 100 years. But soils have become drier, annual rainfall has increased, and more rain arrives in heavy downpours. In the coming decades, summers are likely to be increasingly hot and dry, which would reduce the productivity of farms and ranches, change parts of the landscape, and possibly harm human health".

It has also been noted that Oklahoma's grasslands "are a vital component in nature's fight against climate change" due to their capacity to capture and store carbon.

Politics of climate change in Oklahoma 

Discussions of climate change in Oklahoma have been described as "subtle", as Oklahoma is a highly conservative and religious state, where the oil and gas industry plays a leading role in the economy.

In 2015, surveys identified Woodward County, Oklahoma as one of the most climate skeptical counties in the United States.

Oklahoma is home to Senator Jim Inhofe, who served from 1994 to 2023 and is known for throwing a snowball in the US Senate in 2015 "in an effort to disprove what he sees as alarmist conclusions about man-made climate change," and to politician and climate skeptic Jim Bridenstine. Bridenstine modified his positions on climate upon becoming NASA administrator in 2018. Former Oklahoma attorney general Scott Pruitt, who has been closely allied with the fossil fuel industry, served as Environmental Protection Agency Administrator from 2017-2018.

Flooding is a major concern in the state, especially in the wake of unusually heavy rains. Cities such as Tulsa are responding  with flood control efforts in preparation for extreme weather events, without using the term climate change.

Despite current debates on appropriate terminology, when viewed from a historical rather than a political perspective, it is clear that the climate of Oklahoma has changed considerably since the dust storms of the 1930s, which occurred after years of drought and poor farming practices. Online course resources have been assembled by a NASA, NSF and NOAA-supported program, "The Earth System Science Education Alliance (ESSEA)" under the title "Dust Bowl: Is Climate Change Starting Another?,"  enabling students to assess the history of the 1930s Dust Bowl from a 21st century perspective of computers and space-based data collection.

Precipitation and water resources

Oklahoma's Water by 2060 plan calls for Oklahoma to use "no more fresh water in 2060 than was used in 2012."

"Changing the climate is likely to increase the demand for water but make it less available. As rising temperatures increase evaporation and water use by plants, soils are likely to become even drier. Average rainfall is likely to decrease during spring and summer. Seventy years from now, the longest period without rain each year is likely to be at least three days longer than it is today. Increased evaporation and decreased rainfall are likely to reduce the average flow of rivers and streams".

"Decreased river flows can create problems for navigation, recreation, public water supplies, and electric power generation. Commercial navigation can be suspended during droughts when there is too little water to keep channels deep enough for barge traffic. Decreased river flows can also lower the water level in lakes and reservoirs, which may limit municipal water supplies; impair swimming, fishing, and other recreational activities; and reduce hydroelectric power generation. Conventional power plants also need adequate water for cooling. Compounding the challenges for electric utilities, rising temperatures are expected to increase the demand for electricity for air conditioning".

"Although summer droughts are likely to become more severe, floods may also intensify. During the last 50 years, the amount of rain falling during the wettest four days of the year has increased about 15 percent in the Great Plains. Over the next several decades, the amount of rainfall during the wettest days of the year is likely to continue to increase, which would increase flooding".

According to Kevin Kloesel, director of the Oklahoma Climatological Survey, Oklahoma had "one record cold" in the 30 years leading up to 2019, and "14 different days at record highs" since 2000. Kloesel anticipates that "precipitation changes will amplify these warming extremes, as Oklahoma appears poised for more frequent, lengthier periods of drought interspersed with floods."

NPR notes that nearly one third of the dams in Oklahoma, over 1,400 in all, are approaching the end of their projected operational life, and that the increased intensity of flooding may exacerbate the chances of dam breaks with damaging consequences for populated areas.

Agriculture

"Hot days can be unhealthy—even dangerous. Seventy years from now, Oklahoma is likely to have three to four times as many days above 100°F as it has today". The arid climate that typifies the American West is expected to continue expanding to the east, reducing the crops that can be grown by Oklahoma farmer.

"Increasing droughts and higher temperatures are likely to interfere with Oklahoma's farms and cattle ranches. Hot weather causes cows to eat less and grow more slowly, and it can threaten their health. Reduced water availability would create challenges for ranchers, as well as farmers who irrigate crops such as wheat". "Drier soils will increase the need for farmers to irrigate their crops, but sufficient water might not be available. Approximately 16 percent of Oklahoma's farmland is irrigated. In the Panhandle, most irrigation water is ground water from the High Plains Aquifer System. As a result, this aquifer is becoming depleted. Since the 1950s, the amount of water stored in the aquifer has declined by more than 25 percent in parts of the Panhandle". "Yields are likely to decline by about 50 percent in fields that can no longer be irrigated. The early flowering of winter wheat could have negative repercussions on livestock farmers who depend on it for feed".

Wildfires, tornadoes, and landscape change

"Higher temperatures and drought are likely to increase the severity, frequency, and extent of wildfires, which could harm property, livelihoods, and human health. On average, more than 1 percent of the land in Oklahoma has burned each decade since 1984. Wildfire smoke pollutes the air and can increase medical visits for chest pains, respiratory problems, and heart problems".

"The combination of more fires and drier conditions may change parts of Oklahoma’s landscape. Many plants and animals living in the dry lands of western Oklahoma are already near the limits of what they can tolerate. In some cases, native vegetation may persist as the climate changes. But when fire destroys the natural cover, the native grasses and woody plants may be replaced by non-native grasses, which can become established more readily after a fire. Because non-native grasses are generally more prone to intense fires, native plants may be unable to re-establish themselves.

"Scientists do not know how the frequency and severity of tornadoes will change. Rising concentrations of greenhouse gases tend to increase humidity, and thus atmospheric instability, which would encourage tornadoes. But wind shear is likely to decrease, which would discourage tornadoes. Research is ongoing to learn whether tornadoes will be more or less frequent in the future. Because Oklahoma experiences about 60 tornadoes a year, such research is closely followed by meteorologists in the state".

Prairie conservation and carbon capture 
Ranchers, environmentalists and Osage Nation landowners are working together to preserve Oklahoma's prairie at the Joseph H. Williams Tallgrass Prairie Preserve.

Protected grasslands in Oklahoma "mitigate nearly four metric tons of carbon dioxide per year — the equivalent of taking 4 million cars off the road."

Standards for climate change education 

Oklahoma's standards for science education incorporate material from the 2013 Next Generation Science Standards, and include information about Oklahoma's climate. Consensus has yet to emerge on how to present the topic of climate change in the state's public schools.

See also
 Plug-in electric vehicles in Oklahoma

References

Further reading
 National Climate Assessment -  - covers Kansas, Oklahoma and Texas

External links 
 Global Climate Change and the Implications for Oklahoma, Oklahoma Climatological Survey

Oklahoma
Environment of Oklahoma